The Grand National is a wooden roller coaster located at Blackpool Pleasure Beach in Blackpool, Lancashire in the United Kingdom. It was designed and constructed by American engineer Charles Paige in 1935 and is now one of two surviving wooden Möbius Loop roller coasters in the world (the other being Racer at Kennywood). Grand National is the only surviving twin-track roller coaster in Britain in which two cars race against one another.
This ride has an individual lap bar and seatbelts as the restraints.

History 
Grand National opened in 1935 and was built by Charles Paige and Henry G. Traver, whose Cyclone Coaster  at Long Beach, California inspired the new ride. It was a part of the program of new rides being built at the Pleasure Beach and was the main new ride for the beach that year. British architect Joseph Emberton designed the original concrete and glass station. 
After major private sector investments at the Pleasure Beach funded Grand National £1 million in 1990, the station was completely rebuilt to address previous alterations and repair needs.

The ride was designated as a Grade II listed building on 19 April 2017.

Ride Experience  
The roller coaster's theme and name come from the famous Grand National horse race, with elements of the ride signposted to mimic features of the Aintree course, including Becher's Brook and Canal Turn. 

The trains climb the lift-hill and pass under the 'They're Off' sign and race through 'Becher's Brook', 'Valentine's' and 'Canal Turn' before returning to the 'Winning Post'. The current trains for this ride were manufactured by Philadelphia Toboggan Coasters.

Special events
Andy Hine, the chairman of the Roller Coaster Club of Great Britain, was married on the ride in the early 1990s. A plaque with his name is installed on one of the trains.

On 2 March 2019, the world record for "most naked riders on a theme park ride" was broken on the ride by 195 people.

Incidents

On 20 May 2004, an electrical fault in the lighting system of the roof of the station caused a fire which destroyed the station and parts of two adjacent rides as well as the trains of the ride.  Firefighters used water from the nearby ride Valhalla, to put out the flames. The station was rebuilt and new trains installed and the ride re-opened on 28 October 2004 after repairs were completed.

In 2014, 58-year-old Robert Sycamore broke his neck whilst riding. He had an underlying back condition.

On 1 June 2021, staff had to escort about 30 passengers down the track when Grand National broke down while approaching its peak height. The ride was checked and reopened later that day.

The Grand National is consistently breaking down. It requires maintaining more than any other ride at Blackpool Pleasure Beach. It has been on the theme park’s maintenance list everyday since 2018.

See also

Listed buildings in Blackpool

References

Art Deco architecture in England
Blackpool Pleasure Beach
Roller coasters in the United Kingdom